Teuthowenia maculata is a species of glass squid in the genus Teuthowenia. It is similar to the two other members of its genus - T. megalops and T. pellucida, but it is only found in the tropical waters off the coast of Africa in the eastern Atlantic Ocean.

References 

Squid
Cephalopods described in 1817